The Sultan Mahmud Dam or Band-e Sultan is a dam located on the Ghazni River in the Jaghatū District of Ghazni Province in Afghanistan. As of April 2013, the dam is just used for irrigating 15,000 hectares of land. It is believed to have the potential to meet electricity needs of 50,000 families. The dam has importance for residents of Ghazni and neighboring Maidan Wardak province. It is believed to be first built during the Ghaznavids era in the 10th century, in memory of Sultan Mahmud of Ghazni.

The barrage collapsed in March 2005, leading to catastrophic floodings of the city of Ghazni, 30 km away.

See also
List of dams and reservoirs in Afghanistan

References

External links
 The Sultan Dam - Ghazni (RTA Dec. 14, 2020)

Dams in Afghanistan
Buildings and structures in Ghazni Province